Sugar Daddy is a candy bar on a stick manufactured by Tootsie Roll Industries that is essentially a moderately hard brick of caramel.  A bite-sized caramel-flavored jelly bean candy based on the Sugar Daddy is marketed under the name Sugar Babies.

The James O. Welch Company was purchased by Nabisco (now Mondelēz International) in 1963. The Welch brands were sold to Warner-Lambert in 1988; Tootsie Roll Industries acquired them in 1993.

Today, Sugar Daddy candies are produced in two standard sizes, the Junior Pop, with 53 kcal, and the Large Pop, with 200 kcal. For Valentine's Day and Christmas, there are also giant sizes: half-pound with 964 kcal, and one-pound with 1928 kcal.

See also
 List of confectionery brands
Sugar Babies
Sugar Mama

References

Tootsie Roll Industries brands
Products introduced in 1925
Sugar Family candy